The canton of Mont-Saint-Martin is an administrative division of the Meurthe-et-Moselle department, northeastern France. Its borders were modified at the French canton reorganisation which came into effect in March 2015. Its seat is in Mont-Saint-Martin.

It consists of the following communes:

Allondrelle-la-Malmaison
Baslieux
Bazailles
Beuveille
Boismont
Charency-Vezin
Colmey
Cons-la-Grandville
Cosnes-et-Romain
Doncourt-lès-Longuyon
Épiez-sur-Chiers
Fresnois-la-Montagne
Gorcy
Grand-Failly
Han-devant-Pierrepont
Longuyon
Montigny-sur-Chiers
Mont-Saint-Martin
Othe
Petit-Failly
Pierrepont
Saint-Jean-lès-Longuyon
Saint-Pancré
Saint-Supplet
Tellancourt
Ugny
Ville-au-Montois
Ville-Houdlémont
Villers-la-Chèvre
Villers-le-Rond
Villette
Viviers-sur-Chiers

References

Cantons of Meurthe-et-Moselle